Roger Wickson may refer to:

Roger Wickson (figure skater), Canadian figure skater
Roger Wickson (headmaster) (born 1940), headmaster of the King's School, Chester